The Marjeyoun District is a district in the Nabatieh Governorate of Lebanon. The capital of the district is Marjeyoun.

Marjeyoun (also Marjayoun Marj Ayoun) stands majestically at a hill facing Mount Haramoun (Jabal El Sheikh, Mount Hermon) to the East, Beaufort 1000 years old Crusader Castle (Sh'ief Arnoun) above the Litani River and overlooking Mount Amel (Jabal Amel) to the West, The Rihan, Niha and the Lebanon Mountain Range to the North and the fertile plains of Sahil Marjeyoun that extends into Northern Israel between the Galilee finger and plains immediately underneath the Golan Heights.

Photos of Marjeyoun
Marjeyoum Photo Album
Baladiyat Marjeyoun photo gallery

A view of Marjeyoun by satellite

References

External links
 Khiam Official website
 The Official Marjeyoun Municipality
 www.marjeyoun.net

 
Districts of Lebanon